EAP Films was originally founded as Edirisinghe Cinema Theatres in 1972. It has the largest share of the Sri Lanka theatre market with more than 200 screens island-wide. It started producing films in 1994; its first release was Dhawala Pushpaya (1994). The company has been listed on the Colombo Stock Exchange since the 2000s.

History 
The company was founded by a husband-and-wife team in 1972 as Edirisinghe Cinema Theatres under its parent company EAP Group. EAP acquired Savoy Cinema theatres in 1974. At first only Sinhala films were distributed, but in the mid-1980s a license for distribution of Hollywood movies was added.

Its theatres converted to digital in 2014. An IMAX cinema was built in Wellawatte. EAP Film had their highest recorded bookings of 10,000 tickets for the 3D Tamil film 2.0. Sunil Ariyaratne's Vijayaba Kollaya was also screened in 3D.

In 2015 Village Roadshow of Australia and EAP Group signed a partnership. Ben Holdings acquired EAP Films for 12 billion Rs. in 2019.

References 

Cinema of Sri Lanka
Companies of Sri Lanka
1972 establishments in Sri Lanka